Mwape Mwelwa (born 3 June 1986) is a Zambian football midfielder who plays for Zesco United.
Best chawama has ever produced

References

1986 births
Living people
Zambian footballers
Zambia international footballers
Red Arrows F.C. players
ZESCO United F.C. players
Association football midfielders
Zambia A' international footballers
2016 African Nations Championship players